Naval Base Ulithi was major United States Navy base at the Ulithi Atoll in the Caroline Islands in the western Pacific Ocean, to the north of New Guinea during World War II. The base was built to support the island-hopping Pacific war efforts of the allied nations fighting the Empire of Japan. In terms of the number of ships at one base, Naval Base Ulithi was the largest Naval Base in the world in 1944 and 1945, with over 617 ships at times.

History

Naval Base Ulithi was used in 1944 and 1945, as part of US Naval Base Carolines, as staging operations and for attacks on Japan's bases to the North. On September 23 the US landed on Ulithi and found the Japanese had abandoned the Ulithi Atoll.  The US Navy Seabee 18th Special Battalion arrived on October 1, 1944. The US Navy Seabee 88th Naval Construction Battalion arrived at Ulithi on 11 November 1944. At Ulithi, the Seebees did major construction on five islands at Ulithi Atoll. The main projects were building a large fleet recreation center on Mogmog Island for 20,000 troops, docking piers, small plane airstrips, seaplane base, pontoon piers and camps. On Mogmog Island the Seabess built the Seabee base camp and Seabee supply depot. On Sorlen Island a 1,600 theatre was constructed, a large landing craft camp, 1600-man mess hall, Naval headquarters, Marine aviation camp and 100-bed Naval hospital. Over 9,000 men were stationed at the base to run the operations.

The Seabee 58th Naval Construction Battalion did R&R at Ulithi before departing to Okinawa Island. After Typhoon Cobra in December of 1944, Naval Base Ulithi send out ships to pick up survivors of ships that had sank in the storm. Some ships that were damaged in the storm were repaired at Ulithi.  

Ulithi had a large fleet anchorage used for staging and repair of ships. The Seabees built an airbase to support half of a night fighter squadron, a utility squadron, and a light inshore patrol squadron. At the airbase, the Navy kept up to 150 aircraft fighter planes to replace any lost on aircraft carriers. At the airbase were staging facilities for transport aircraft. A large camp was built for the maintenance crew of planes and ships. A camp was built to house crews of ships under repair and a few staging camps. A supply depot was built to support the ships, planes, and troops at Ulithi. Most supplies like fuel, ammunition, and spare parts were stored in cargo ships in the Atoll and unloaded as needed. Seabees handed over 20,000 tons of cargo a month. The 18th Special departed 25 May 1945 to Leyte-Samar Naval Base. On 10 October 1944, part of the 6th Special Battalion arrived at Ulithi for unloading and loading of ships, the 6th handled over 12,000 tons of cargo a month. The 6th departed in June 1945, ending its work.  The 51st Battalion arrived on October 8, 1944, and widened, lengthened, and improved the captured Falalop Airfield. A new 3,500-by-150-foot fighter runway was built. The 51st also built a fuel tank frame and fuel pier.

On 16 April 1945, the Seabee Naval Construction Battalion Detachment 1044 arrived at Ulithi. Most of the 1044 work on damage control and repair sections at the base. The 1044 departed 25 July 1945, ending their work.

The US Navy fleet oiler USS Mississinewa (AO-59) was sunk on 20 November 1944 at Ulithi. The USS Mississinewa was hit by a Japanese Kaiten manned torpedo. The ship had explosions and sank with a loss of 63 crew members. Four other kaiten did not hit any other ships. Over 100,000 barrels for fuel oil was stored at Ulithi in tanker ships and land tank farms. From Ulithi Operation Hailstone was stage against the base at Truk Lagoon. Naval Base Ulithi supported a number of other smaller bases in the Naval Base Carolines.  

Japan planned a third major attack on Ulithi, but was canceled with the surrender of Japan in September 1945. Japan had sent a fleet I-400-class submarines to attack Ulithi, but Japan surrendered while the subs were en route to when to Ulithi. With the news of surrender the I-400 fleet returned to Japan.

The 88th Naval Construction Battalion depart Ulithi on 7 February 1945 and arrived at Bobon, Samar, Philippine Islands 10 February 10, 1945. There they built a PT boat repair base as part of Leyte-Samar Naval Base. On November 8, 1944, Naval Construction Maintenance Unit 603 arrived to do general maintenance of the airstrip. The Fleet Post Office at Ulithi was #3011.  When Leyte-Samar Naval Base was completed much of the operations at Ulithi was transferred to the Leyte-Samar Naval Base, departing on May 7, 1945. During its operation the base supported the nearby Naval Base Kossol Roads.

LORAN station
The United States Coast Guard built a LORAN (Long Range Navigational Signal) station at Ulithi in December 1944 and operated the station on Potoangroas Island till February 1945. For the Korean War the LORAN station was moved to Falalop Island near the Falalop Airfield, as Potoangroas Island was only resupplied by sea and in rough weather, there was no resupply.   The Ulithi LORAN Satation was closed in February 1962 and moved tp Yap Island. In 1978 the Global Positioning System replaced the need for LORAN.

Background
The Caroline Islands is now the Federated States of Micronesia nation. Micronesia comprises the Kosrae State, Pohnpei State, Chuuk State (in past spelled Truk) and Yap State. After the Spanish–American War in 1898, the islands became a German colony and German naval base. At the start of World War I in 1914 British warships destroyed the German colonial plantation owner's radio station. On October 7, 1914, Japan invaded and took over Yap island without a battle. Japan and Britain made a treaty giving  Japan the Pacific islands north of the Equator, signed at the Treaty of Versailles in 1919. In the 1930s Japan built naval and airbases on many of the islands.  Truk Lagoon was the largest and strongest of these bases. The United States Army Air Forces bombed the Truk base, but it was bypassed in the amphibious landing war. Japan's Truk base had five airfields, fleet anchorage, a few seaplane bases, torpedo boat bases, repair facilities, and later a radar station.
Japan also built a large base at Ponape, now Pohnpei. By February of 1944, the US bombers destroyed Truk and by sea, the US Navy cut had cut off Truk and the 5,000 Japanese troops. The US also bypassed Ponape in the Senyavin Islands and it 8,000 troops.  

The United States Armed Forces built a large base at Ulithi Atoll in the Yap islands, as it had a large fleet anchorage for up to 700 ships.  The US Army 81st Division landed unopposed on Ulithi on 23 September 1944. Soon US Navy Seabees started work building the large base at Ulithi. The US Navy survey ship  found the lagoon was well protected and usable for fleet anchorage with depths ranging from 80 to 100 feet. 
The Ulithi coral reef is about 20 miles long and 10 miles wide, with over 30 small islands the largest island only half a square mile in area. The four largest islands are Sorlen, Falalop, Asor, and Mogmog, bases were built on all four. Japan bombed the US base at Ulithi a few times, with only marginal damage.

Fleet Support

The United States Fifth Fleet used Ulithi for staging, including: Philippines campaign, Operation Hailstone and the troop landings at Okinawa for the Battle of Okinawa, called Operation Iceberg. In March 1945 106 destroyers, 29 aircraft carriers, 15 battleships, and 23 cruisers departed for Okinawa. Due to the large fleet at Ulithi, the base was kept top secret until found by Japan. Japan attacked the Fifth Fleet at Ulithi  in Operation Tan No. 2 on March 11, 1945 using long-range kamikaze.

The United States Third Fleet under William Halsey, had one of carrier group, Vice Admiral John S. McCain, the Third Fleet strongest of TF 38's carrier groups, sent to Ulithi for resupply of fuel, food and ammunition on 22 October. McCain's carrier group missed the Battle of the Sibuyan Sea on 24 October 1944, part of the Battle of Leyte Gulf. 

Murderers' Row was the nickname given to the Third Fleet's aircraft carriers at anchor in a row at Ulithi. In December 1944 after operations in the Philippines, the carriers line up at Ulithi Atoll. In the row were USS Wasp (CV-18), USS Yorktown (CV-10), USS Hornet (CV-12), USS Hancock (CV-19) and USS Ticonderoga (CV-14). Murderers' Row ships were part of the Fast Carrier Task Force. 

After the Third Fleet was hit by Typhoon Cobra (1944) it ported in Ulithi, arriving in 22 December 1944. A court of inquiry was held on the board  a destroyer tender on 26 December 1944. The court was held to see if  William Halsey any action were to be done for Halsey sailing into the Typhoon. The court found “ “were errors in judgment committed under stress of war operations and stemming from a commendable desire to meet military requirements”.  The Typhoon became known as Halsey's Typhoon, as ships were damaged, three destroyers sank and 146 aircraft were lost. The destroyers  lost were the USS Spence (DD-512), USS Hull (DD-350) and USS Monaghan (DD-354),  775 crewmen were also also.

Kamikaze attack

On 11 March 1945, Kamikaze aircraft hit USS Randolph (CV-15) aircraft carrier on her stern starboard side in nighttime raid on Ulithi. USS Randolph lost 27 men and were killed, some of the 105 wounded the US Naval hospital ship USS Relief (AH-1). The raid was called Operation Tan No. 2 that took off from Kanoya Air Field. The USS Randolph was quickly repaired at Ulithi and put back in service.

Mogmog Island
US Navy Seabees turned the swamps and forest on Mogmog Island (Mog Mof) into a large Ulithi fleet recreation center. Also on Mogmog Island the Seabees built the Ulithi Seabees camp with barracks and depot. At the depot Seabees stored all the supplies and gear needed to build and maintain the base at Ulithi.  The Mogmog Island recreation center had bandstand, a refreshment center, a 1,200-seat theatre with a 25-by-40-foot stage, a sport center with 4 baseball diamonds and 200-seat chapel. The recreation center could house up to 8,000 men and 1,000 officers daily. Mogmog Island had a large recreation beach resort for those on liberty leave. At the center and atoll, the Navy had an ice cream barge that could make up to 500 gallons of ice cream for the troops in 8 hours.  The ice cream barge would also make fresh bread products. The base officer’s and Chief petty officer's club was built on Mogmog Island. Crowley's Tavern was a popular spot. On Mogmog Island the Seabess built Mogmog Airfield for light aircraft for short trips to the other nearby islands. Off the shore of Mogmog Island in the Atoll was the Mogmog floating seaplane base, supported by seaplane tenders.

Asor Island
Naval Base Ulithi headquarters and the military cemetary were built on Asor Island. The 6th Special Naval Construction Battalion was in charge of most burial details. The 63 men lost during the attack on the USS Mississinewa AO-59, were given interment at Ulithi cemetery, as were some of those lost on the USS Franklin. After the war the cemetery was closed as the troops were reinterred in new, permanent cemeteries in the states.

Sorlen Island
On Sorlen Island a second and small fleet recreation center was built. The main part of the recreation center was the 1,600 seat movie theater. A distillation center and 5,000-gallon storage tanks system was built make freshwater. While the US Marine fighter base was on Falalop Island, a camp for Marine aviation was built on Sorlen Island, with barrack and mess halls. Naval Base Ulithi has many Landing crafts used to move gear and personal from ship to ship and ship to shore. On Sorlen Island a large Landing craft camp was built. The Fifth Fleet and Third Fleet had hundreds of Landing craft used in amphibious landings, that also use the camp and depot for maintaining the crafts when needed. A quonset naval hospital was constructed on Sorlen Island with a 100-bed unit. A power plant was built to supply electricity.
Seabees built the Sorlen Airfield for small plane use.

Ulithi Submarine Base
Many US Navy submarines were used in the Pacific War. The submarine attacked warships and sank supply ships that were needed by Japan to resupply their many bases in the Pacific. US subs also did reconnaissance patrols, landed guerrilla special forces and search and rescue missions for downed aircrew mem. US submarine had long ranges, but needed to be resupplied with fuel, food, torpedoes and deck gun shells. At Naval Base Ulithi the Navy set up a floating submarine base in the atoll. The submarine tenders: USS Sperry (AS-12) and USS Sumner (AGS-5) were stationed in the atoll to supply the submarines. While the submarine was being resupplied, and repaired if needed, crews could have a break (R&R) at the Ulithi's fleet recreation center on Mogmog Island.  Some of the subs stationed at the base were: USS Albacore (SS-218), USS Skate (SS-305), and USS Flying Fish (SS-229),

Ulithi repair depot
The US Navy set up a large ship and boat repair depot at Naval Base Ulithi. The repair depot provided the fleet with support to keep ships and subs tactically available in the Pacific War with the repair and supply depot, rather than ships having to return to continental United States. The Navy had built special auxiliary floating drydocks that were able to repair battle damage to even the largest ships and do regular maintenance in the field saving ships trans-pacific travel time for repair. Supply store ships were also at the base with the parts needed to keep the fleet ready.   The most noted ship repaired at the depot was the USS Franklin (CV-13). The USS Franklin on 19 March 1945 was hit by Japanese bombs off  Okinawa. Fire and explosions damaged the ship, killing and wounding many. The crew was able to save the badly damaged ship. Under her own power, she made it to Ulithi repair depot for emergency repairs before going to the Brooklyn Navy Yard for a year-long complete rebuild.  The USS Houston (CL-81) and USS Reno (CL-96) also had emergency repairs at Ulithi. USS Hancock (CV-19) and USS Ticonderoga (CV-14) were repaired at the base after kamikaze attacks. The USS Bennington (CV-20) was repaired with a badly damaged flight deck from  Typhoon Cobra.  
Some of the Ulithi repair depot ships and crafts:
USS AFDB-2, very large Auxiliary floating drydock able to repair battleships
USS Richland (YFD-64),  Auxiliary floating drydock
USS Oak Ridge (ARDM-1), Auxiliary floating drydock
USS Endurance (ARDM-3), Auxiliary floating drydock
AFDL-32, a type of Small Auxiliary Floating Dry Docks
USS ARD-13, ARD Auxiliary floating drydock, mostly destroyer repair
USS ARD-15, ARD Auxiliary floating drydock, mostly destroyer repair
USS ARD-23, ARD Auxiliary floating drydock, mostly destroyer repair
USS Jason (AR-8), large repair ship
USS Ajax, large repair ship
USS Nestor (ARB-6), repair ship and small craft tender
USS Oceanus (ARB-2), battle damage repair ship
USS Vestal, large repair ship
USS Mona Island (ARG-9), repair ship and flagship for MinRon 10
USS Deliver (ARS-23), rescue and salvage ship
USS Shackle (ARS-9), rescue and salvage ship  
USS Supply (IX-147), aircraft stores ship
YRB-34, Floating Workshop

Ulithi seaplane bases

 
The US Navy set up a two large seaplane base at Naval Base Ulithi, Falalop seaplane base and Mogmog seaplane base. Seaplanes did reconnaissance patrols and search, also rescue missions for downed aircrew mem and survivors of sunk ships. The most common seaplanes at the base were Consolidated PBY Catalina and Martin PBM Mariner. The Mogmog seaplane base take off and landing was a spot marked in the atoll off the fleet recreation center on Mogmog Island.The seaplanes were supported by a floating base of seaplane tenders. The second seaplane base was on Falalop Island. On Falalop Island a seaplane ramp was constructed by the Seabees at one end of Falalop airfield. The seaplane ramp extended from the extreme low tide mark to the seaplane parking hardstand. The Falalop seaplane base was completed on 5 December 1944. Seaplane tenders and land base had stores to supply: food, fuel, ammo, spare parts. The seaplane tender also had housing and mess halls for the aircrew while the seaplane was being serviced. Aircrew on leave could go to Ulithi's fleet recreation center on Mogmog Island. Some seaplane tenders were stationed at Ulithi seaplane base for months. Other seaplane tenders came to Naval Base Ulithi to resupply the ship's stores before returning to a US Naval Advance Base. Some came to Ulithi repair depot to be repaired. 
Some seaplane tenders at Naval Base Ulithi:

USS Corson (AVP-37)
USS Hamlin (AV-15)
USS Casco (AVP-12)
USS Suisun 
USS Chandeleur (AV-10) 
USS Mackinac (AVP-13) 
USS Barataria (AVP-33) 
USS Chincoteague (AVP-24) 
USS Kenneth Whiting (AV-14) 
USS Onslow (AVP-48) 
USS Pocomoke (AV-9) 
USS St. George (AV-16) 
USS Duxbury Bay (AVP-38) 
USS San Pablo (AVP-30) 
USS Yakutat (AVP-32) 
USS Cumberland Sound (AV-17) 
USS Shelikof (AVP-52)
USS Coos Bay
YSD-42 Seaplane Wrecking Derrick

UN Navy seaplane Squadrons based at Ulithi seaplane base:
VPB-17 with Martin PBM Mariner
VP-41 with Martin PBM Mariner
VPB-202 with Martin PBM Mariner
VP-48 with Martin PBM Mariner
VPB-18 with Martin PBM Mariner
VPB-23 with Consolidated PBY Catalina
VPB-20 with Martin PBM Mariner
VP-42 with Martin PBM Mariner

Submarine chaser base
To help protect the base and shipping around the base, Naval Base Ulithi had a fleet of submarine chasers. The submarine chasers were supported by a submarine chaser tender ship: the  USS Mindanao (ARG-3) was stationed at Ulithi to support the fleet of submarine chasers and some crash boats. crash boats were fast boats use to rescue downed airmen. Some of the submarine chasers served at Ulithi: USS PC-1137, USS PC-598, USS PC-1136, USS PGM-18, and USS PC-1138.

Ulithi destroyer base

Hundreds of US Navy destroyers were used in the Pacific war. Destroyers were used to protect capital ships like aircraft carriers, battleships and heavy cruisers. Destroyers were used to screen and protect convoy of ships. Destroyers were used to hunt submarines and protect amphibious landings at beaches. Destroyers had anti-aircraft guns, radar, and forward-launched ASW weapons, dual-purpose guns, depth charges, and torpedoes. Like the submarines, they needed to be restocked with food, fuel, supplies, and weaponss to keep operational. Ulithi had a large destroyer base, with destroyer tenders. Destroyer tenders could do minor repair work on the ships also, and major work could be done at the Ulithi repair depot. 
Destroyer tenders stationed at Ulithi:
USS Cascade (AD-16)
USS Prairie (AD-15)
USS Piedmont (AD-17)
USS Yosemite (AD-19)
USS Hamul (AD-20) to support Okinawa campaign damage
USS Dixie (AD-14) September 1944 to February 1945
USS Sierra (AD-18) 15 March 1945 to 25 May 1945

USS Markab

Ulithi floating hospital
For four months (March to June) in 1945 Naval Base Ulithi was used as a major forward Naval hospital. US Navy Hospital ships were stationed Naval Base Ulithi during parts of the war and some were stationed shortly as they joined staging for upcoming invasions. Hospital ships also were able to resupply and refuel at the base. 
USS Relief (AH-1), 550-beds, stationed at Ulithi two times, received wounded from USS Randolph.
USS Mercy (AH-8), up to 400 patients, stationed at Ulithi 5th Fleet to care for wounded from Battle of Okinawa.
USS Samaritan (AH-10) up to 394 patients, stationed at Ulithi two times.
USS Rescue (AH-18) up to 800 patients, was stationed at Ulithi in March 1945 before going to Okinawa.
USS Solace (AH-5) up to 418 patients, stationed at Ulithi two times, was stationed at Ulithi in March 1945 before going to Okinawa.
USS Tranquillity (AH-14) up to 802 patients, stationed at Ulithi near the end of war, departed Ulithi to help survivors from the USS Indianapolis (CA-35) sinking.
USS Hope (AH-7), up to 400 patients, was stationed shortly at Ulithi in March 1945 before going to Okinawa.
USS Bountiful (AH-9) up to 477 patients, stationed at Ulithi with Okinawa and Battle of Iwo Jima patients.

Net Laying
To protect the many ships at Ulithi  the Navy had 1,260 yards of anti-torpedo net install in the Towachi Channel and an  6,390 yards at other inlets to the atoll. The ship USS Tuscana (AKN-3) supplied the nets.
Net laying ships stationed at Ulithi 
USS Viburnum (AN-57) hit a mine while working on 28 October 1944, was repaired at the base.
USS Anaqua
USS Snowbell (AN-52)
USS Rosewood (AN-31)
USS Cornel (AN-45)

Stationed at Ulithi
Over 6,000 seamen were at Ulithi, stationed in ships and on shore bases.
On 13 March 1945, there were 647 ships at anchor at Ulithi, some stationed, some in for repair or resupply. Just before the departure of the fleet to Okinawa there were 722 ships at Ulithi. United States Merchant Navy ships also were unloaded at Naval Base Ulithi to keep the fleet and base supplied. 
Service Squadron 10, a floating 400 ship base with  tankers, Fleet oilers, refrigerator  ships, ammunition ships, supply ships, floating docks and repair ships. Service Squadron 10 started departing Enewetak Atoll 4 October 1944 for Ulithi arriving on the 15th.

USS Abatan, distilling ship freshwater from the sea for land base and small vessels.
USS Dauphin (APA-97), floating barracks, troopship
USS Amador, ammunition tender 
USS Firedrake (AE-14), ammunition tender 
USS Lassen (AE-3), ammunition tender stores
SS Plymouth Victory, ammunition stores
USS Turkey (AM-13), minesweeper
USS Sabine (AO-25), carrier oiler
USS Aucilla, carrier oiler
USS Marias (AO-57), battleship oiler
USS Platte (AO-24), battleship oiler
USS Taluga (AO-62), cruisers  oiler
USS Sepulga (AO-20), cruisers oiler
USS Cowanesque (AO-79), destroyer oiler
USS Chotauk (IX-188), destroyer oiler
USS Elk (IX-115), destroyer oiler
USS Malvern (IX-138), destroyer oiler
USS Genesee (AOG-8), oiler
USS Enoree (AO-69), oiler
USS Nantahala (AO-60), oiler
USS Tombigbee (AOG-11), oiler
USS Saranac (AO-74), oiler
USS Neosho (AO-48), oiler
USS Caliente (AO-53), oiler
USS Pecos (AO-65), oiler
USS Cimarron (AO-22), oiler
USS Standard Arrow (ID-1532), oiler
USS Wabash (AOG-4), oiler
USS Arethusa (IX-135), oiler
USS Inca (IX-229), oiler
USS Neches (AO-47), oiler
USS Lackawanna (AO-40), oiler
USS Gazelle (IX-116), oiler
USS Kaskaskia (AO-27), oiler
USS Antona (IX-133), oiler tanker barge
YO-76, oiler tanker barge 
USS Bullwheel (YO-46), oiler tanker barge
USS Gamage (IX-227), storage for lubricants and drummed petroleum
USS Giraffe (IX-118), gasoline tanker
USS Quiros, water tanker 
USS Athanasia, stores ship
USS Palisana (AF-39), stores ship
USS Latona (AF-35), stores ship
USS Graffias (AF-29), stores ship
USS Trefoil (IX-149), stores ship
USS Quartz (IX-150), stores ship
USS Megrez (AK-126), stores ship
USS Aldebaran, food stores ship
USS Polaris (AF-11), food stores ship
USS Sirius (AF-60), refrigerator food stores ship
USS Rutilicus (AK-113), food stores ship
SS Cape Pilar, merchant food stores ship
USS Ascella, medical stores ship 
USS Azimech, medical stores ship 
USS Iolanda, stores ship
USS Carmita (IX-152), stores ship
USS Arctic (AF-7), stores ship
USS Gordonia (AF-43), stores ship
USS Hesperia, stores ship
USS Volans, stores ship
USS Karin (AF-33), stores ship 
USS Adria, stores ship 
USS Antares (AG-10), stores ship 
USS Lioba (AF-36), stores ship
USS Kerstin (AF-34), stores ship
USS Luna, stores ship
USS Corundum (IX-164), spare parts
USS Trefoil (IX-149), stores ship
USS Silica (IX-151)  fresh, frozen food, and dry provisions, 
APL-15 - None propelled barracks ship 
APL-14 troopsship - None propelled barracks ship
USS Orvetta (IX-157), barracks ship
USS Sea Hag,  barracks ship
USS Seaward (IX-209) troopship and mail ship (was USS LST-278)
YF-1038 cover lighter Type B ship
YG-36, YG-33 and YG-37 self-propelled Garbage lighter
YF-254 lighter
YC-1006 lighter
YP-688 lighter
YF-788  lighter
YF-786  lighter
USS Turkey (AMS-56) minesweeper
USS Unadilla (ATA-182) Tugboat, Type V ship
USS Chickasaw (AT-83), Tug
USS ATR 71, Tug
USS AT 116, Tug
USS YTB-372, Tug
USS Hitchiti (ATF-103), Tug
USS YTB-384, Tug 
USS Mobile Point, Tug 
USS Arapaho (ATF-68), Tug 
USS Point Loma, dredge ship
USS Benson, dredge
Landing Ship, Tanks (LST) for moving supplies
Small landing craft for moving supplies and personal
Motor Launch boats for moving personal

Airfields
Falalop Airfield, now Ulithi Airport, on Falalop Island, built by Japan, but abandoned, improved by Navy Seabees. A single runway spanning the entire width of the island.  US Marine Air Group 45 (MAG-45), VMSB-24, and Service Squadron 45 with is headquarters were stationed at Falalop. MAG-45 and VMSB-24 flew missions to Japan's bases on Yap Island, Fais Island and Sorol Island, with their Grumman TBF Avenger, Grumman F6F Hellcat and Curtiss SB2C Helldiver. MAG-45 also flew anti-submarine patrols to protect Ulithi. The Marine Avengers sank two of the midget subs, only one sank a ship the an US Navy oiler at Ulithi. 
Sorlen Airfield on Sorlen Island, Built by Seabees, an airfield for light aircraft. Started 12 December 1944, and completed January 27, 1945.
Mogmog Airfield, light aircraft, built on Mogmog Island to support the Mogmog Island Seabee camp and the Mogmog Island recreation center. Seabess started building on 12 December 1944 and completed on 27 January 1945.
At the three airfields the Navy kept up to 150 aircraft fighters to replace any lost on aircraft carriers.
Mogmog seaplane base, a floating seaplane base, supported by seaplane tenders.
Falalop Seaplane base on Falalop Island and in the atoll. Falalop Island base built starting 4 November 1944 and completed 5 December 1944
Fais Airfield is to the east of Ulithi by 87 km (54 miles) on Fais Island. Ulithi supported the 3,000 feet runway built there in 1945. The runway was mostly used as an emergency landing strip.

Gallery

See also

Operation Tan No. 2
US Naval Advance Bases

External links
youtube.com Ulithi Atoll Anchorage Aerial Views of US Navy 5th Fleet at Anchor
 youtube.com 1940s World War II: Ulithi, Anchorage
youtube.com  US air operations at newly built airstrip on Ulithi Atoll in World War II HD Stock Footage

References

Naval Stations of the United States Navy
World War II airfields in the Pacific Ocean Theater
Airfields of the United States Navy
Military installations closed in the 1940s
Closed installations of the United States Navy
Islands of Yap